George Castle is an American freelance sports journalist and author, based in Chicago, Illinois.

Castle's most frequent assignment has been as the Chicago Cubs beat writer for The Times of Northwest Indiana.  He spent many years as a sportswriter for Chicago's Lerner Newspapers.

He has written several books about the Cubs and general baseball history, including:
 The Million to One Team
 Where Have All Our Cubs Gone?
 Baseball and The Media: How Fans Lose in Today’s Coverage of the Game
 Entangled in Ivy.
 Jackie Robinson West: The Triumph and Tragedy of America's Favorite Little League Team.
 Baseball's Game Changers: Icons, Record Breakers, Scandals, Sensational Series, and MoreBaseball's Game Changers: Icons, Record Breakers, Scandals, Sensational Series, and More

References

Sportswriters from Illinois
Writers from Chicago
Living people
Year of birth missing (living people)
Place of birth missing (living people)